"Morning Comes" is the eighth episode of the second season and twentieth overall episode of the American television drama series Dexter, which first aired on 18 November 2007 on Showtime in the United States. The episode was written by Scott Buck and was directed by Keith Gordon.

Plot

Lila and Debra are at odds with one another. Deb doesn't like her coming around after Dexter broke up with Rita and Lila feels the same. Both Deb and Dexter dislike each others' current choice of dates. Dexter finds a toy of Cody's in his bag and comments how Cody has been doing it a lot lately. Lila comments that Cody is trying to control him and Dexter states that all seven-year-olds think about is candy. Rita tells Dexter that he is no longer welcome to visit her house or her children... Dexter realizes that Lila is lying when she claims her apartment fire was an accident. Dexter tries to avoid Lila by saying he is going bowling but she tags along. After bowling, Jimenez tries to kill Dexter but is cut short when Dexter's friends back him up. He cut Dexter on the arm but not very deeply. Dexter decides to give back into his addiction and kill Jimenez. Lundy re-examines all of the department's old cases when he suspects that the Bay Harbor Butcher has a history in law enforcement. The police are set on edge as Lundy is calling their police work into question. Angel and Deb look at some old connections to the Bay Harbor Butcher. Deb and Angel are able to get the license plate of who they believe to be the Bay Harbor Butcher. Lundy, Deb, and Angel discover the person who was driving the car is a member of the Miami Metro Police. Some of Dexter's blood work reports are called into question as well. Lundy and Deb go on a dinner date.  Doakes comes back into the station to talk to Lundy. Lundy discloses that a case of his was dropped due to Dexter's blood work. Doakes retaliates by breaking into Dexter's apartment and finding the hidden collection of blood slides. Dexter looks through Jimenez's wallet to discover that she paid him to attack Dexter. Dexter breaks up with Lila and threatens her to stay away.

Production
Filming locations for the episode included the AMF Bowling Center in Woodland Hills, Los Angeles, as well as sites in Palos Verdes Estates, and Santa Monica, California.

Reception

The episode was positively received. IGN's Eric Goldman gave the episode a rating of 8.8 out of 10, and commented that "[o]ne thing's for sure - when a show has you this involved and theorizing this much on what could happen, it's working especially well." The A.V. Club critic Scott Tobias gave the episode an A grade and stated "Man oh man what a thrilling episode. I love when a great series like this one makes that decisive shift into the third act, when all those weeks of set-up and slowly ratcheted tension really start to pay off. While I’ve had some niggling problems with the season overall, I think the table has been set more effective than it was in Season One, because we’re getting a chance to see what happens when Dexter is put in a corner and has to fight his way out."

References

External links

 
 "Morning Comes" at Showtime's website

2007 American television episodes
Dexter (TV series) episodes
Television episodes directed by Keith Gordon